Alfredo Prucker (13 May 1926 – 22 November 2015) was an Italian Nordic skier who competed in the 1940s and 1950s.

At the 1948 Winter Olympics, Prucker finished 29th in the 18 km cross-country skiing event. Prucker finished 12th in the Nordic combined event and 38th in the 18 km cross-country skiing event. His best finish at the Winter Olympics occurred at Cortina d'Ampezzo in 1956 when he finished eight in the Nordic combined event.

Further notable results

Cross-country skiing 
 1954: 3rd, Italian men's championships of cross-country skiing, 50 km
 1956: 3rd, Italian men's championships of cross-country skiing, 50 km

Nordic combined 
 1947: 3rd, Italian championships of Nordic combined skiing
 1948: 2nd, Italian championships of Nordic combined skiing
 1950: 1st, Italian championships of Nordic combined skiing
 1951: 2nd, Italian championships of Nordic combined skiing
 1952: 1st, Italian championships of Nordic combined skiing
 1953: 1st, Italian championships of Nordic combined skiing
 1954: 1st, Italian championships of Nordic combined skiing
 1955: 1st, Italian championships of Nordic combined skiing
 1956: 1st, Italian championships of Nordic combined skiing

References

External links
Olympic cross country skiing 18 km results: 1948-52
Olympic nordic combined results: 1948-64

2015 deaths
1926 births
Olympic cross-country skiers of Italy
Olympic Nordic combined skiers of Italy
Olympic ski jumpers of Italy
Cross-country skiers at the 1948 Winter Olympics
Cross-country skiers at the 1952 Winter Olympics
Nordic combined skiers at the 1948 Winter Olympics
Nordic combined skiers at the 1952 Winter Olympics
Nordic combined skiers at the 1956 Winter Olympics
Ski jumpers at the 1956 Winter Olympics
Italian male cross-country skiers
Italian male Nordic combined skiers
Italian male ski jumpers
People from Urtijëi
Sportspeople from Südtirol